Shawnee Hills may refer to:

 Shawnee Hills, a geographical region of southern Illinois, United States
 Shawnee National Forest, located partly within the region
 Shawnee Hills AVA, a wine appellation within the region
 Shawnee Hills, Delaware County, Ohio
 Shawnee Hills, Greene County, Ohio